The 2014 John Newcombe Women's Pro Challenge is a professional tennis tournament played on outdoor hard courts. It is the 3rd edition of the tournament which is part of the 2014 ITF Women's Circuit, offering a total of $50,000 in prize money. It takes place in New Braunfels, Texas, United States between 27 October to 2 November 2014.

Singles main-draw entrants

Seeds

1 Rankings are as of October 20, 2014

Other entrants
The following players received wildcards into the singles main draw:
 Robin Anderson
 Alexa Glatch
 Bernarda Pera

The following players received entry from the qualifying draw:
 Kristie Ahn
 Julia Elbaba
 Edina Gallovits-Hall
 Gaia Sanesi

The following player received entry by a lucky loser spot:
 Nicole Vaidišová

Champions

Singles

 Irina Falconi def.  Jennifer Brady, 7–6(7–3), 6–2

Doubles

 Verónica Cepede Royg /  Mariana Duque def.  Alexa Glatch /  Bernarda Pera, 6–0, 6–3

External links
Official website
2014 John Newcombe Women's Pro Challenge at ITFtennis.com

John Newcombe Women's Pro Challenge
Hard court tennis tournaments in the United States